Benjamin Brame (1772–1851) was the first mayor of Ipswich Corporation following the creation of the role by the passing of the Municipal Corporations Act 1835. He was elected on 31 December 1835 and commenced his mayoralty on 1 January 1836.

Brame had been a burgess and supported Henry Baring in the 1818 United Kingdom general election, in which Baring was narrowly defeated by William Newton.

Brame was a solicitor with offices in Lower Brook Street, St. Peter's Parish. He was enrolled as a Freeman on 8 September 1794. He was one of the ten aldermen established by the Municipal Corporations Act, and aligned with the Whig party. He was nominated for mayor by Frederick Francis Seekamp and seconded by  William May.

References

1772 births
1851 deaths
Mayors of Ipswich, Suffolk
English solicitors
19th-century English lawyers